Jean Kleyn (born 26 August 1993) is a South African-born Irish professional rugby union player, currently playing for Irish United Rugby Championship and European Rugby Champions Cup side Munster. He has represented Ireland after qualifying through residency as a 'project player'. Kleyn was born and grew up in South Africa, and qualified for Ireland through residency. His regular position is lock.

Youth rugby

Kleyn first played provincial rugby for the s during the 2012 Under-19 Provincial Championship, also being promoted to the  side in the same season, as well as in 2013. He picked up two winner's medals, with Western Province ending both the 2012 Under-19 Provincial Championship and 2013 Under-21 Provincial Championship seasons as champions. Despite playing regularly for the senior side in 2014, he made a further three appearances in the 2014 Under-19 Provincial Championship.

Western Province / Stormers

Despite being named in the 2013 and 2014 Vodacom Cup squads, Kleyn never made an appearance, suffering a knee injury in 2013 and an ankle injury in 2014.

Kleyn was included in the  squad for the 2014 Super Rugby season. A further three appearances off the bench followed in May 2014.

Kleyn established himself as a regular in the Stormers squad during the 2015 Super Rugby season, appearing in thirteen of their seventeen matches, including five starts. He once again was a key player for a Western Province team attempting to retain their Currie Cup title in the 2015 competition, playing in all twelve matches, of which he started eleven.

Kleyn suffered an arm injury in a warm-up match against the  prior to the 2016 Super Rugby season, which ruled him out of the start of the competition. During the international break, Kleyn started two matches for Western Province in the 2016 Currie Cup qualification series, the first of those being a match against the  during which Kleyn scored his first try in senior rugby, scoring ten minutes from time to help his side to a 43–34 victory.

Munster

On 3 September 2016, Kleyn made his competitive debut for Munster when he came on as a substitute against Scarlets in the sides opening 2016–17 Pro12 fixture. On 17 September 2016, Kleyn scored his first try for Munster in their 20–16 away win against Welsh side Dragons in Rodney Parade. The match was also his first start for the province. On 17 February 2017, it was announced that Kleyn had been ruled out for 8–10 weeks due to a neck injury. The injury was sustained during the United Rugby Championship fixture against Dragons on 10 February.

On 1 September 2017, in what was his return to competitive action following the aforementioned neck injury, Kleyn scored two tries in Munster's win against Benetton in Round 1 of the 2017–18 Pro14. Kleyn scored a try and won the Man-of-the-Match award in Munster's 21–16 win against Ospreys on 16 September 2017. Kleyn was nominated for the 2018 Munster Rugby Player of the Year award in April 2018. He signed a three-year contract extension with Munster in September 2018. Kleyn was ruled out for six weeks after undergoing surgery for a thumb injury in November 2018. He returned from the injury in Munster's Pro14 fixture against Ulster on 21 December 2018. Kleyn earned his 50th cap for Munster in their 26–17 win against Leinster on 29 December 2018.

Kleyn signed a two-year contract extension with Munster in January 2022. He earned his 100th cap for Munster in their 34–17 away win against Italian side Zebre Parma in round 11 of the 2021–22 United Rugby Championship on 29 January 2022. Kleyn was selected in the 2021–22 United Rugby Championship dream team following his performances for Munster during that season.

Ireland

Kleyn qualified through residency to play for Ireland on 8 August 2019, and was selected in Joe Schmidt's 44–man training squad for the 2019 Rugby World Cup. He made his debut for Ireland in their 2019 Rugby World Cup warm-up match against Italy on 10 August 2019, starting in the 29–10 win, and was selected in the 31-man Ireland squad for the 2019 Rugby World Cup, starting in Ireland's 35–0 win against Russia before featuring off the bench in the 47–5 win against Samoa in Ireland's final pool game,

Statistics

International analysis by opposition

Correct as of 12 October 2019

Honours

Individual
United Rugby Championship dream team:
Selected (1): 2021–22

References

External links
Munster Profile
URC Profile

Ireland Profile

 

Living people
1993 births
People from Krugersdorp
Naturalised citizens of Ireland
Rugby union players from Gauteng
South African rugby union players
Stormers players
Western Province (rugby union) players
Munster Rugby players
South African expatriate rugby union players
Expatriate rugby union players in Ireland
South African expatriate sportspeople in Ireland
Ireland international rugby union players
Rugby union locks